Claire Allan (born 7 May 1985) is an English rugby union player. She was a member of the  squad to the 2014 Women's Rugby World Cup. She played at both the 2009 and 2013 Rugby World Cup Sevens.

She represented Team GB at the 2016 Summer Olympics.

Allan was educated at Orleans Park School, Twickenham, and earned a BTEC in Sport and Exercise at Loughborough University.

Allan is a police officer.

References

External links
 
 
 
 

1985 births
Living people
England women's international rugby union players
English female rugby union players
Female rugby sevens players
Rugby sevens players at the 2016 Summer Olympics
Olympic rugby sevens players of Great Britain
Great Britain national rugby sevens team players
Commonwealth Games medallists in rugby sevens
Commonwealth Games bronze medallists for England
People educated at Orleans Park School
Alumni of Loughborough University
Rugby sevens players at the 2018 Commonwealth Games
England international women's rugby sevens players
Medallists at the 2018 Commonwealth Games